Lee Eun-ju (born 28 February 1977 in Sacheon, South Korea) is the Associate Head Coach at the University of Louisiana at Monroe and is a Korean former NCAA basketball player who led Northeast Louisiana University to the 1984 women's NCAA Final Four and competed in the 2000 Summer Olympics.

References

1977 births
Living people
South Korean women's basketball players
Olympic basketball players of South Korea
Basketball players at the 2000 Summer Olympics
Asian Games medalists in basketball
Basketball players at the 2002 Asian Games
Asian Games silver medalists for South Korea

Medalists at the 2002 Asian Games